Ademir Sobrinho (born 6 July 1952 in Espera Feliz) is a Brazilian Admiral of the fleet, and Chief of the Joint Staff of the Armed Forces between 2015 and 2019.

Career
Sobrinho joined the Brazilian Navy in 1970, and was declared a Navy Guard in 1976. Throughout his career, he held, among other functions, the command of the Frigate Independência (F-44), the command of the River Patrol Ship Rôndonia (P-51), the naval adidance in Italy and the command of the Amazon Flotilla.

References

1952 births
Living people
People from Minas Gerais
Brazilian admirals